The Yacoubian Building is a mixed-use building in Downtown Cairo, Egypt, built in 1937. Located on No. 34 on Talaat Harb Street, Cairo, the Art Deco style edifice was named after its Lebanese-Armenian owner and businessman Hagop Yacoubian. The architect of the building was Garo Balian.

The building served as a residence for Cairo's upper-class during the Kingdom of Egypt, home to cotton millionaires, members of the royal family, and foreign nationals. During and after the 1952 revolution the building was used as a domicile for Egyptian military officers and their wives. By the 1970s the building was transferred to mixed use, including shopfronts and offices. 

A fictionalised version of the building serves as a metaphor for Cairo's own deterioration in the 2003 Arabic language novel  The Yacoubian Building by Alaa Al Aswany. The novel was adapted into a 2006 film of the same name, directed by Marwan Hamed. A larger building, located on Talaat Harb Square was used for the exteriors.

The Yacoubian Building in Beirut, Lebanon belonged to the same family.

References

Buildings and structures in Cairo
Tourist attractions in Cairo
Art Deco architecture
Buildings and structures completed in 1937
Armenian diaspora in Egypt
20th-century architecture in Egypt